Özyurt can refer to:

 Özyurt, Devrek
 Özyurt, Polatlı
 Özyurt, Şenkaya